Świat Nieruchomości (English: World of Real Estate Journal) is a quarterly peer-reviewed academic journal. It was established in 1991 and covers real estate, concentrating mostly on Central and Eastern European countries. It is mainly written in Polish, however every article is published with an abstract written both in Polish and English. Every year's final issue is published in English. The journal is published by the Fundacja Uniwersytetu Ekonomicznego w Krakowie (English: Foundation of Cracow University of Economics).

The journal is listed by the Ministry of Science and Higher Education (Poland) in 'segment B', giving it 7 points out of 10.

References

External links 
 

Polish-language journals
Publications established in 1991
Economics journals
Quarterly journals
English-language journals
Multilingual journals
1991 establishments in Poland
Academic journals published in Poland